"Time for Miracles" is a power ballad by Adam Lambert. It was released on October 16, 2009, via Amazon.com. Although the song was his first release since American Idol, it was not his official debut single, which was the title track to his debut studio album, For Your Entertainment. The song is featured as the ending theme in the 2009 disaster film 2012 and is included on the film's soundtrack. A full version of the song was released on October 17, 2009, via YouTube and on October 20, 2009, via digital download. The song was written by Alain Johannes and his partner Natasha Shneider, who were known for contributing to several Queens of the Stone Age albums. Shneider died of cancer in 2008.

Reception
Before "Time for Miracles" was released to the public, it had already garnered positive reviews.

Brian May of Queen was able to listen to the full track and praised the song as "truly sensational" and complimented Lambert's vocals, stating, "Adam's voice reaches out with sensitivity, depth, maturity, and awesome range and power that will make jaws drop all around the world."

Having heard only the preview of the track, Entertainment Weekly'''s Michael Slezak stated that the song "sounds like it has the potential to be a power-ballad smash".

Music video
The official music video was released on October 21, 2009, through Myspace. The video portrays Lambert walking placidly through a disaster scene, like those portrayed in 2012''. Footage from the film and the clips of Adam singing are edited together.

Another music video, popularized on YouTube does not show Lambert at all, but rather a disaster sequence showing the lead characters of the film attempting to escape the destruction of Los Angeles, California.

In the movie, a slightly different version of the song is played during the closing credits.

Chart performance
On the chart week ending November 7, 2009, "Time for Miracles" debuted at number 50 on the Billboard Hot 100. In the United States, the song has sold 124,000 legal digital downloads.

References

2009 singles
Adam Lambert songs
Music videos directed by Wayne Isham
Rock ballads
2009 songs
RCA Records singles
2000s ballads
Song recordings produced by Rob Cavallo
2012 phenomenon